An instrumental or instrumental song is music normally without any vocals, although it might include some inarticulate vocals, such as shouted backup vocals in a big band setting. Through semantic widening, a broader sense of the word song may refer to instrumentals. The music is primarily or exclusively produced using musical instruments. An instrumental can exist in music notation, after it is written by a composer; in the mind of the composer (especially in cases where the composer themselves will perform the piece, as in the case of a blues solo guitarist or a folk music fiddle player); as a piece that is performed live by a single instrumentalist or a musical ensemble, which could range in components from a duo or trio to a large big band, concert band or orchestra.

In a song that is otherwise sung, a section that is not sung but which is played by instruments can be called an instrumental interlude, or, if it occurs at the beginning of the song, before the singer starts to sing, an instrumental introduction. If the instrumental section highlights the skill, musicality, and often the virtuosity of a particular performer (or group of performers), the section may be called a "solo" (e.g., the guitar solo that is a key section of heavy metal music and hard rock songs). If the instruments are percussion instruments, the interlude can be called a percussion interlude or "percussion break". These interludes are a form of break in the song.

In popular music
 
In commercial popular music, instrumental tracks are sometimes renderings, remixes of a corresponding release that features vocals, but they may also be compositions originally conceived without vocals. One example of a genre in which both vocal/instrumental and solely instrumental songs are produced is blues. A blues band often uses mostly songs that have lyrics that are sung, but during the band's show, they may also perform instrumental songs which only include electric guitar, harmonica, upright bass/electric bass and drum kit.

Number-one instrumentals

Borderline cases

Some recordings which include brief or non-musical use of the human voice are typically considered instrumentals. Examples include songs with the following:
 Short verbal interjections (as in "Tequila", "Topsy", "Wipe Out", "The Hustle", or "Bentley's Gonna Sort You Out")
 Repetitive nonsense words (e.g., "la la..." (as in "Calcutta") or "Woo Hoo")
 Non-musical spoken passages in the background of the track (e.g., "To Live Is to Die" by Metallica or "Wasteland" by Chelsea Grin)
 Wordless vocal effects, such as drones (e.g., "Rockit" or "Flying")
 Vocal percussion, such as beatbox B-sides on rap singles
 Yelling (e.g. "Cry for a Shadow")
 Yodeling (e.g., "Hocus Pocus")
 Whistling (e.g., "I Was Kaiser Bill's Batman" or "Colonel Bogey March")
 Spoken statements at the end of the track (e.g., "God Bless the Children of the Beast" by Mötley Crüe or "For the Love of God" by Steve Vai)
 Non-musical vocal recordings taken from other media (e.g., "Vampires" by Godsmack)
 Field recordings which may or may not contain non-lyrical words (e.g., many songs by Godspeed You! Black Emperor and other post-rock bands)

Songs including actual musical—rhythmic, melodic, and lyrical—vocals might still be categorized as instrumentals if the vocals appear only as a short part of an extended piece (e.g., "Unchained Melody" (Les Baxter), "Batman Theme", "TSOP (The Sound of Philadelphia)", "Pick Up the Pieces", "The Hustle", "Fly, Robin, Fly", "Get Up and Boogie", "Do It Any Way You Wanna", and "Gonna Fly Now"), though this definition is loose and subjective.

Falling just outside of that definition is "Theme from Shaft" by Isaac Hayes.

"Better Off Alone", which began as an instrumental by DJ Jurgen, had vocals by Judith Pronk, who would become a seminal part of Alice Deejay, added in later releases of the track.

See also
 A cappella, vocal music or singing without instrumental accompaniment
 Backing track, a pre-recorded music that singers sing along to or a karaoke without vocals
 Beautiful music
 Easy listening
 Instrumental hip hop
 Instrumental rock
 Medley
 List of rock instrumentals
 Post-rock
 Smooth jazz

Notes

References

 
Music-related lists
Musical compositions
Song forms